The anthem for the Nueva Esparta State, Venezuela, was written by Miguel Ángel Mata Silva; and composed by Benigno Rodríguez Bruzual.

Lyrics in Spanish
Chorus 
Gloria a Margarita, ¡la perla de oriente!
Gloria a Nueva Esparta, ¡Patria del valor!
que nunca se apague su estrella fulgente,
su estrella de gloria, libertad y amor.

Verse One 
Coronas de nubes de la Matasiete,
cinturón de espumas el Caribe Mar,
y es el heroísmo su escudo y ariete,
su rito el trabajo, la gloria su altar.
En la magna lucha levanta primero
cual iris sagrado, nuestro pabellón;
y nunca lo rinde su brazo guerrero,
pues ella es el faro de la insurrección.

Verse Two 
Su ilustre espartano, la fama pregona,
la historia la ciñe de lauro inmortal.
Sus hijos son héroes de Marte y Belona,
sus héroes son hijos de Homero y Mistral.
Siete estrellas blancas, sagradas y bellas
la patria coronan bordando su azul
Margarita es una de las siete estrellas
y llena de rayos el cerúleo tul.

Verse Three 
Le dieron renombre de heroica y divina,
renombre que esplende cual nimbo en su sien 
con Luisa la mártir, la egregia heroína 
Arismendi, Gómez, Mariño y también 
Maneiro, Figueroa, Lares y Fermín 
y Díaz, Aguirre, Solva (Cayetano)
y al par de mil héroes del Campo Antolín. 

Verse Four 
Unidos sus hijos en santa armonía 
por ley de existencia, por noble deber
el yugo arrojemos de la tiranía, 
cada vez que el yugo nos quiera imponer 
y siempre guardemos con nuestra bravura 
la sagrada herencia de la Libertad, 
y siempre nos una por nuestra ventura 
con lazos de flores la fraternidad.

Lyrics translated into English
Chorus 
Glory to Margarita, the pearl of the East!
Glory to New Esparta, land of courage!
May her bright star never fade,
her star of glory, freedom, and love.

Verse One 
Crowns of clouds from the Matasiete,
belt of foam the Caribbean Sea,
and heroism is her shield and battering ram,
her ritual is work, glory her altar.
In the great battle, she rises first
Such a sacred rainbow, our pavilion;
and will never surrender her warrior arm,
because she is the guiding light of the insurrection.

Verse Two 
Her illustrious spartan, the fame announces,
history clads her with immortal praise.
Her children are heroes of Mars and Bellona,
her heroes are children of Homer and Mistral.
Seven white stars, sacred and beautiful
the country they crown embroidering her blue
Margarita is one of the seven stars
and full of rays is her azure tulle.

Verse Three 
They gave her heroic and divine reputation,
reputation that shines like a halo in her temple
with Luisa the martyr, the famous heroine 
Arismendi, Gómez, Mariño and also 
Maneiro, Figueroa, Lares and Fermín 
and Díaz, Aguirre, Solva (Cayetano)
and together with one thousand heroes of Campo Antolín. 

Verse Four 
Her children united in holy harmony 
by law of existence, by noble duty
we shall throw off the yoke of tyranny, 
every time they try to impose it on us
and shall we always guard with our courage 
the sacred heirloom of liberty, 
and bind us always by our fate 
with bonds of flowers and brotherhood.

See also
 List of anthems of Venezuela

References

External links

Anthems of Venezuela
Nueva Esparta
Spanish-language songs